Dexter Cabin was the Leadville, Colorado home and hunting lodge of James V. Dexter, a mining investor and businessman.  Although it is a cabin, the interior has been described as "surprisingly plush," "elegantly finished," and "incredibly ornate.".

It is a Colorado State Historic Site and is operated as a museum by the state under History Colorado, together with Healy House.  The two are located within the Leadville Historic District, which is itself a National Historic Landmark. Dexter Cabin was moved to its present location next to Healy House.

Dexter Cabin was listed on the National Register of Historic Places in 1970.

See also
National Register of Historic Places listings in Lake County, Colorado

References

External links

 Healy House Museum and Dexter Cabin History Colorado

Houses completed in 1879
Houses on the National Register of Historic Places in Colorado
Historic house museums in Colorado
Museums in Lake County, Colorado
History Colorado
Houses in Lake County, Colorado
National Register of Historic Places in Lake County, Colorado
Individually listed contributing properties to historic districts on the National Register in Colorado
Leadville Historic District